Phytophthora tentaculata is a plant pathogen that causes root and stalk rot. It was first isolated in 1993 in a nursery in Germany infecting Chrysanthemum, Verbena, and Delphinium ajacis. It has since been found infecting a Verbena  in Majorca, Spain in June 2001 but was thought to be restricted to nurseries in Germany and the Netherlands. Other species have since been found to be infected, Santolina chamaecyparissus (Lavender cotton) in Spain in 2004, Gerbera jamesonii in Italy 2006, and Aucklandia lappa in China in 2008.

References

tentaculata
Water mould plant pathogens and diseases
Ornamental plant pathogens and diseases
Species described in 1993